John Daniel Peter Bowden (born 25 July 1973) is an English cricketer.  Bowden is a left-handed batsman who bowls left-arm medium pace.  He was born at Sidcup, Kent.

Bowden represented the Kent Cricket Board in List A cricket.  His debut List A match came against Denmark in the 1999 NatWest Trophy.  From 1999 to 2003, he represented the Board in 12 List A matches, the last of which came against Derbyshire in the 2003 Cheltenham & Gloucester Trophy.  In his 12 List A matches, he scored 342 runs at a batting average of 31.09, with a 2 half centuries and a high score of 91.  In the field he took 4 catches.

He currently plays for Sevenoaks Vine Cricket Club in the Kent Cricket League.

References

External links
John Bowden at Cricinfo
John Bowden at CricketArchive

1973 births
Living people
People from Sidcup
English cricketers
Kent Cricket Board cricketers